Licuala spinosa, the Mangrove fan palm, is a species of palm in the genus Licuala. The plant is native to the wet places of fresh and salt water of Southeast Asia. It may grow in clumps. It prefers full sun, a lot of water, and is more cold hardy than most Licuala species.

A Cambodian name for L. spinosa is pha'aw, in that region its leaves are used to make hats and wrap food. Its heart and terminal bud prepared as a vegetable are appreciated by Cambodians. In traditional Cambodian medicine, both a febrifuge remedy and for a preparation for the health of the foetus, use the root of the palm in compounds, while the bark of the trunk is used to treat tuberculosis.

Gallery

References

External links

spinosa
Flora of Asia
Garden plants of Asia